Pacific Coast Harmony (PCH) is the San Diego, California, chapter of the Barbershop Harmony Society.  The mixed-gender chorus sings in the a cappella style known as barbershop music.  In its origin, PCH was an all-male chorus, placed 19th overall at the chorus competition at the Society's international convention in Indianapolis in 2006, and placed 22nd in Portland in 2012 and Las Vegas in 2017.  In 2019, Pacific Coast Harmony converted to mixed-gender membership, and is currently directed by Sweet Adelines member Bonnie McKibben.

References

External links
PCH website

Barbershop Harmony Society choruses
Musical groups from San Diego
A cappella musical groups